Manemarak is an Afrikaans puppet television show about a tiny alien who regularly travels from his far-away planet to study life on earth.

Story

Manemarak, following in the footsteps of his grandfather, travels to and explores the earth. His faithful companion is an artificially intelligent space-ship computer. The computer has knowledge of earth that was recorded by Manemarak's grandfather.

Trivia

Manemerak is an anagram of "kameraman", which means cameraman in Afrikaans.
The little character's spaceship was actually a walnut shell. The name Manemarak is still in use today, as a nickname by itself, and in many portmanteaus with similar-sounding Afrikaans names.

South African science fiction television series
South African children's television series
South African television shows featuring puppetry